The Irish Institute of Legal Executives was formed in 1987, incorporated in 1992. It consists of and is the representative body for legal executives in Ireland. The aim of the institute is to provide a system of training and examination and to obtain a recognised professional qualification for those engaged in legal work. There are similar Legal Executive positions and representative bodies in Australia, New Zealand and in the UK.

Membership
As well as full membership for those employed as legal executives, formerly managing clerks, there is fellowship, associate membership and student membership available to those with and studying in Accredited Professional Legal Studies. 
IILEX members can become Commissioners for Oaths.

Senior Legal Executive Member (S.I.I.L.Ex.) 
Legal Executive Member (M.I.I.L.Ex.)
Associate Member (A.I.I.L.Ex.)
Student Legal Executive Member

Diploma in Professional Legal Studies
IILEx recognises the Diploma in Legal Studies and Practice offered by Griffith College. The Diploma may be taken at either the Dublin or Cork campuses of Griffith College. Students may attend lectures in person or online. On successful completion of the Diploma, graduates may apply to become Associate Members of IILEx. Each year the Frank Crummey Perpetual Trophy is awarded to the student with the best academic results on the Diploma.

External links
The Irish Institute of Legal Executives(IILEX)
Griffith College/IILEX Professional Legal Studies Courses
ILEX(UK)
Institute of Legal Executives(Australia)
The New Zealand Institute of Legal Executives
The Law Society of Ireland
Land Registry Ireland
Irish Statute Book

References

Legal organisations based in Ireland
1987 establishments in Ireland
Organizations established in 1987